
Gmina Bukowina Tatrzańska is a rural gmina (administrative district) in Tatra County, Lesser Poland Voivodeship, in southern Poland, on the Slovak border.

Villages
Gmina Bukowina Tatrzańska contains the villages and settlements of Białka Tatrzańska, Brzegi, Bukowina Tatrzańska, Czarna Góra, Groń, Jurgów, Leśnica and Rzepiska.

Neighbouring gminas
Gmina Bukowina Tatrzańska is bordered by the town of Zakopane and by the gminas of Biały Dunajec, Łapsze Niżne, Nowy Targ, Poronin and Szaflary. It also borders Slovakia.

References
Polish official population figures 2006

Bukowina Tatrzanska
Tatra County